Three ships of the Royal Navy have borne the name HMS Carlisle, after Carlisle, Cumbria:

  was a 60-gun fourth rate launched in 1693 and wrecked in 1696.
  was a 48-gun fourth rate launched in 1698 and accidentally blown up in 1700.
  was a  launched in 1918 and scrapped in 1949.

Royal Navy ship names